The Båstad riots is the name given to the riots that took place during a Davis Cup tennis match between Sweden and Rhodesia on May 3, 1968 in Båstad, Sweden.

Demonstrators were protesting the participation of the two apartheid countries, Rhodesia and South Africa, in the international tennis competition. The countries were barred from other international sporting events. It became the most violent confrontation between the Swedish police and demonstrators during the 1960s. It was followed by a dialogue between the Swedish government and the demonstrators to curb the escalation of violence. The match later was played in secrecy, and Sweden won 4-1.

References

1968 Davis Cup
1968 in Sweden
1968 riots
1968 in tennis
Riots and civil disorder in Sweden
Sports riots
Politics and sports
Sport in Rhodesia
May 1968 events in Europe
Foreign relations of Rhodesia
1968 in Swedish tennis